Cursed is an American fantasy drama streaming television series that premiered on Netflix on July 17, 2020. It is based on the illustrated novel of the same name by Frank Miller and Tom Wheeler. The set location of the series is the United Kingdom. In July 2021, the series was canceled after one season.

Premise
Cursed is described as "a re-imagining of the Arthurian legend, told through the eyes of Nimue, a young heroine with a mysterious gift who is destined to become the powerful (and tragic) Lady of the Lake. After her mother's death, she finds an unexpected partner in Arthur, a young mercenary, in a quest to find Merlin and deliver an ancient sword to him. Over the course of her journey, Nimue will become a symbol of courage and rebellion against the terrifying Red Paladins, and their complicit King Uther." In addition, Andreeva calls the show "a coming-of-age story whose themes are familiar to our own time: the obliteration of the natural world, religious terror, senseless war, and finding the courage to lead in the face of the impossible".

Cast and characters

Main
 Katherine Langford as Nimue, a young Fey woman who is shunned by her village, as they believe she is "cursed". Her village is soon slaughtered by religious zealots, "the Red Paladins", but she escapes and is entrusted with the legendary Sword of Power by her mother Lenore, who tells her to get it to "Merlin" moments before Lenore's death at the hands of the Paladins. Setting out on a journey to save her people from a holy war of extinction, Nimue struggles with the corrupting power of the Sword, while coming to grips with her secret history, the powerful magical legacy that flows in her blood, and what it will mean for her and her people when she embraces her destiny as the "Wolf-Blood Witch", and eventually as the Fey Queen.
 Devon Terrell as Arthur, a sellsword who becomes Nimue's main love interest and struggles to rise above the shadow of dishonour and debts left in the wake of his father's death. He becomes an ally of the Fey and slowly begins to regain his family's honour on his journey with Nimue.
 Gustaf Skarsgård as Merlin, a once-formidable magician who has lived for hundreds of years and is now the closest advisor to Uther Pendragon. He seeks to redeem a morally bankrupt past by destroying the Sword of Power when he discovers it still exists, revealing it contains dark magic that will corrupt its wielder and was the loss of his formidable magical powers.
 Daniel Sharman as Weeping Monk / Lancelot, the most powerful warrior in the army of the zealots. He is seen consistently to be the turning point in conflicts between human and Fey, and is seemingly able to track and lead the Paladins to Fey wherever they go, killing them without mercy, though he claims to spare children to spread his message.
 Sebastian Armesto as King Uther, a powerful but deluded king who uses Merlin's counsel as a crutch until discovering he can no longer do magic and his larger manipulations. Uther turns to his mother for guidance, but her political aspirations create a rift between them that forces Uther to take his own counsel. He seeks the Sword of Power, which will solidify his illegitimate claim to the Pendragon Throne.
 Lily Newmark as Pym, Nimue's closest friend who escapes the destruction of their village at the start of the series. She is rescued by Dof after being separated from Nimue, and falls in with Red Spear's pirate raiders, masquerading as a healer in order to stay alive.
 Peter Mullan as Father Carden, the leader of the Red Paladins and the fanatic responsible for their formation under the Roman Catholic faith. He spreads the misguided rhetoric of Fey being demons and leads the Paladins in his goals to hunt Fey to inevitable extinction. He manipulates Lancelot into hunting his own kind on the Paladins' behalf as the Weeping Monk.
 Shalom Brune-Franklin as Sister Igraine / Morgana, Arthur's estranged sister who was sent to a convent as a girl but grew to become the greatest human ally of the Fey. She uses her grandmother's name "Igraine" to conceal her true identity at the abbey and shelters Nimue for a time before leading her to a settlement of Fey where the latter soon becomes Fey Queen, taking Morgana as one of her chief advisors. Morgana eventually learns she contains the potential to become Britannia's greatest sorceress from a Dark God.
 Bella Dayne as Red Spear, the Queen of the Red Spear fleet of pirate raiders and the exiled daughter of Cumber who eventually becomes an ally of the Fey.
 Matt Stokoe as the Green Knight / Gawain, an old friend of Nimue and a champion warrior of the Fey who works to rescue the Fey from their persecution.

Recurring
 Emily Coates as Sister Iris, a teenage girl who grew up in the convent with Morgana and desires to join the Red Paladins – she soon becomes obsessed with killing the Wolf-Blood Witch.
 Polly Walker as Lady Lunete, Queen Regent and Uther's mother, who cares more about her crown than her son, and who harbours a secret.
 Billy Jenkins as Squirrel / Percival, a young Fey boy and one of the only other survivors of the Sky People village.
 Adaku Ononogbo as Kaze, a Fey warrior who defends her people and helps Nimue.
 Johannes Haukur Johannesson as Cumber, the Ice King who claims legitimacy to the Pendragon Throne and commands an army to reclaim it from Uther Pendragon. When he learns of the existence of the Sword of Power, he and his daughters scheme to claim it and so come into conflict with Uther and the Fey.
 Sofia Oxenham as Eydis, eldest daughter to Cumber, who operates as his roving ambassador
 Clive Russell as Wroth, Chief of a Fey tribe called the Tusks
 Sophie Harkness as Sister Celia, a fellow nun and Morgana's lover
 Nikolaj Dencker Schmidt as Dof, a raider who rescues Pym and takes a liking to her
 Zoë Waites as the Widow, a mysterious character who allies with Merlin throughout the course of the series, helping him in times of need. She wears a black veil concealing her identity, but promises Merlin that he will see her face one day.

Notable guests
 Catherine Walker as Lenore, Nimue's mother who gives her the Sword of Power at the start of the series to give to Merlin before her death. It is revealed that she and Merlin shared a brief romance many years ago which conceived and is responsible for Nimue's vast magical powers. Before her death, Lenore had become the High Priestess of the Sky People.
 Andrew Whipp as Jonah, Nimue's father who believes she was cursed as a child
 Peter Guinness as Sir Ector, Arthur's and Morgana's uncle who does not approve of Arthur
 Olafur Darri Olafsson as Rugen the Leper King, who is manipulated by Merlin and seeks to acquire the Sword of Power for his own faction
 Clive Francis as Pope Abel, the pope of the Roman Catholic Church and commander of the Trinity Guards. He threatens to have his Trinity Guards take over Father Carden's Red Paladins if he is unable to produce results.

Episodes

Production

Development
In 2018 it was announced that Netflix had given the production a series order for a first season consisting of ten episodes. The show is based on the novel of the same name by Frank Miller and Tom Wheeler (Simon & Schuster 2019). In addition to creating the television adaptation, Miller and Wheeler were also expected to executive produce the series as well. In September 2018 it was announced that Zetna Fuentes is set to direct and serve as an executive producer for the first two episodes of the series. On July 9, 2021, Netflix canceled the series after one season.

Casting
In September 2018, Katherine Langford was cast in the series' lead role. In March 2019, it was announced Devon Terrell, Gustaf Skarsgård, Peter Mullan, Lily Newmark, Shalom Brune-Franklin, Daniel Sharman, Sebastian Armesto, Emily Coates and Billy Jenkins had joined the cast. Creator Frank Miller appears in a cameo.

Filming
In January 2019, set building began on disused Army land in Deepcut, England. This was expected to continue until March 2019, with filming then scheduled to start and continue until September 2019.

Release
The series was released on Netflix on July 17, 2020.

Reception

Review aggregator Rotten Tomatoes compiled 52 reviews, identified 67% of them as positive, and assessed an average rating of 6.06/10. The website's critics consensus states, "Curseds first season isn't as subversive as its source material, but strong plotting and a heroic performance from Katherine Langford make for an enjoyable escape." Metacritic, which uses a weighted average, assigned the show a score of 59 out of 100 based on 13 reviews, indicating "mixed or average reviews". Lucy Mangan from The Guardian criticized the writing and the acting, but wrote that "at times during its 10 beautifully meaningless hours, it's great fun". Huw Fullerton of Radio Times also opined about the "awkward performances and exposition" while saying that the series "never quite feels big enough to tell this epic story [...] but overall the storytelling does a good job of showcasing varied, interesting characters in a growing cycle of violence." Kelly Lawler of USA Today reviewed the series in relation to the COVID-19 pandemic, giving it an overall positive review, but stating that she was not sure whether it was good or simply "quarantine good".

References

External links

2020 American television series debuts
2020 American television series endings
2020s American drama television series
Adaptations of works by Frank Miller
Coming-of-age television shows
English-language Netflix original programming
Television about magic
Television series based on Arthurian legend
Television shows based on comics
Television shows filmed in England
Witchcraft in television
Wizards in television
Uther Pendragon
Television shows filmed at Pinewood Studios